The women's tournament of football at the 2017 Summer Universiade was held from August 18 to 28 in Taipei, Taiwan.

Teams

Preliminary round
All times are Taiwan Standard Time (UTC+08:00)

Group A

Group B

Group C

Group D

Classification round

9th–13th place quarterfinal

9th–12th place semifinals

11th place match

9th place match

Elimination round

Quarterfinals

5th–8th place semifinals

Semifinals

7th place match

5th place match

Bronze medal match

Gold medal match

Final standings

References

External links
2017 Summer Universiade – Football – Women's tournament

2017
Women
2017 in Taiwanese women's sport
2017 in women's association football